The following radio stations broadcast on FM frequency 99.1 MHz:

Argentina
 Avance in Rosario, Santa Fe
 Beat in Gualeguaychú, Entre Ríos
 ComunicArte in López, Santa Fe
 Del Paraná in Ramallo, Buenos Aires
 La 99.1 in La Plata, Buenos Aires
 LRI743 in Monje, Santa Fe
 Pop in Balcarce, Buenos Aires
 Radio María in General Villegas, Buenos Aires
 Radio María in Federal, Entre Ríos
 Uno in Chabás, Santa Fe
 Urbana in 25 de Mayo, Buenos Aires

Australia
 Raw FM (Australian radio network) in Gosford, New South Wales
 Radio National in Longreach, Queensland
 Goldfields FM in Maryborough, Victoria
 Smart FM in Swan Hill, Victoria
 3VYV in Melbourne, Victoria
5ADL in Adelaide, South Australia

Canada (Channel 256)

 CBLA-FM in Toronto, Ontario
 CBNS-FM in St. Alban's, Newfoundland and Labrador
 CBR-1-FM in Calgary, Alberta
 CBXB-FM in Burns Lake, British Columbia
 CFMM-FM in Prince Albert, Saskatchewan
 CFNJ-FM in St-Gabriel-de-Brandon, Quebec
 CFPG-FM in Winnipeg, Manitoba
 CHNC-FM-1 in Carleton, Quebec
 CHRI-FM in Ottawa, Ontario
 CHTK-FM in Prince Rupert, British Columbia
 CICR-FM in Parrsboro, Nova Scotia
 CIDI-FM in Lac-Brome, Quebec
 CIPC-FM in Port-Cartier, Quebec
 CITA-FM-2 in Amherst, Nova Scotia
 CJAM-FM in Windsor, Ontario
 CJDR-FM in Fernie, British Columbia
 CJMM-FM in Rouyn, Quebec
 CJSB-FM-2 in Benito, Manitoba
 CKFW-FM in Sorrell Lake, Ontario
 CKIX-FM in St. John's, Newfoundland and Labrador
 CKPL-FM in Peachland, British Columbia
 CKXS-FM in Wallaceburg, Ontario
 VF2050 in Labrador City, Newfoundland and Labrador
 VF2346 in Logan Lake, British Columbia

China (mainland) 
 CNR Music Radio in Hohhot
 CNR The Voice of China in Changchun, Guang'an, Shaoyang and Zhuhai

Costa Rica
TIAAC at San Jose

Indonesia
 Delta FM in Jakarta, Indonesia

Korea (Republic of)
 MBC FM4U in Jeonju, Jeollabukdo
 KBS 1FM in Jeju

Macau 
 Transfers CNR The Voice of China

Malaysia
 Mix in Johor Bahru, Johor and Singapore

Mexico

XHBCP-FM in La Paz, Baja California Sur (6 additional transmitters on 99.1)
XHED-FM in Ameca, Jalisco
XHEPR-FM in Ciudad Juárez (El Porvenir), Chihuahua
XHEPT-FM in Misantla, Veracruz
XHMOM-FM in Morelia, Michoacán
XHMOR-FM in Yautepec, Morelos
XHNZI-FM in Nacozari, Sonora
XHPGAN-FM in Apatzingán, Michoacán
XHPTEC-FM in San Sebastián Tecomaxtlahuaca-Santiago Juxtlahuaca, Oaxaca
XHSCFG-FM in San Bartolomé Cuahuixmatlac, Chiautempan Municipality, Tlaxcala
XHSCJJ-FM in Santa Maria Huatulco, Oaxaca
XHSL-FM in Piedras Negras, Coahuila
XHTEU-FM in Tehuacán, Puebla
XHTMJ-FM in Tepatitlán de Morelos, Jalisco
XHUI-FM in Comitán de Dominguez, Chiapas
XHVHT-FM in Villahermosa (Miguel Hidalgo Primera Sección), Tabasco
XHVI-FM in San Juan del Río, Querétaro
XHZAM-FM in Mazamitla, Jalisco

Philippines
DWAM in Batangas City
DWGV-FM in Angeles City
DWYN in Naga City
DYBM in Bacolod City
DYXY in Tacloban City
DXVM in Cagayan De Oro City
DXRT in General Santos City

Turkey

 Radyo 3 in Izmir

United States (Channel 256)

  in Waimea, Hawaii
  in Williams, California
 KBUU-LP in Malibu, California
  in Dickinson, North Dakota
  in Clovis, New Mexico
  in Belgrade, Montana
 KDEA-LP in Delta, Colorado
 KDWD in Marceline, Missouri
 KFZO in Denton, Texas
  in Mankato, Minnesota
 KEWT-LP in Weslaco, Texas
 KFAH in Pineland, Texas
 KFEP-LP in Los Angeles, California
  in Thatcher, Arizona
  in Riverside, California
 KGLS-LP in Tillamook, Oregon
  in Gallup, New Mexico
 KGUS-LP in Gunnison, Colorado
 KHJS-LP in San Antonio, Texas
  in Odessa, Texas
 KILB-LP in Paron, Arkansas
 KILN-LP in Alturas, California
 KJBU-LP in Oxnard, California
  in Copeland, Kansas
  in Ferndale, California
 KKFT in Gardnerville-Minden, Nevada
 KLBP-LP in Long Beach, California
 KLCT-LP in Lubbock, Texas
 KLDB-LP in Los Angeles, California
  in Clayton, Missouri
  in Walker, Minnesota
 KLTO in Moody, Texas
 KMA-FM in Clarinda, Iowa
 KMAG (FM) in Fort Smith, Arkansas
 KMGR in Nephi, Utah
 KMTE-LP in Montrose, Colorado
  in Glenwood Springs, Colorado
  in Fairfield, Texas
 KNNA-FM in Nenana, Alaska
 KNUL in Nulato, Alaska
  in Fort Bridger, Wyoming
 KODA in Houston, Texas
  in Eugene, Oregon
  in Nogales, Arizona
 KORE-LP in Entiat, Washington
 KPJT-LP in Maple Grove, Minnesota
 KPRP-LP in Portland, Oregon
 KQJN-LP in Doniphan, Missouri
 KQYZ in Emerado, North Dakota
  in Dillingham, Alaska
  in Corpus Christi, Texas
 KRZS in Pangburn, Arkansas
  in Girard, Kansas
  in Brooklyn, Iowa
 KSOO-FM in Lennox, South Dakota
 KSQL in Santa Cruz, California
 KTDT-LP in Tucson, Arizona
  in El Dorado, Kansas
  in Prescott, Arizona
 KTPC-LP in Venice, California
 KTYU in Tanana, Alaska
  in Windsor, Colorado
  in Burbank, Washington
  in Idaho Falls, Idaho
  in Waldo, Arkansas
 KWSV-LP in Simi Valley, California
  in Lost Cabin, Wyoming
  in Santa Maria, California
 KXKC in New Iberia, Louisiana
 KXLG in Huron, South Dakota
  in Taos, New Mexico
 KXTA-FM in Gooding, Idaho
 KXVX-LP in Sulphur Springs, Texas
 KYOO-FM in Half Way, Missouri
 KZAH in Harper, Texas
 KZUT-LP in Los Angeles, California
 WAAL in Binghamton, New York
  in Huntsville, Alabama
 WASQ-LP in Statesville, North Carolina
 WAUP-LP in Waupaca, Wisconsin
  in Zarephath, New Jersey
  in Bar Harbor, Maine
 WBWG-LP in Idamay, West Virginia
  in Benton, Kentucky
 WCFY-LP in Evansville, Indiana
 WDCH-FM in Bowie, Maryland
  in Macon, Georgia
 WDJY-LP in Dallas, Georgia
 WDUQ-LP in Benwood, West Virginia
 WDZD-LP in Monroe, North Carolina
  in Miami, Florida
 WEVB-LP in Hazleton, Pennsylvania
  in East Lansing, Michigan
  in Fremont, Ohio
  in Parkersburg, West Virginia
 WGRU-LP in Riverdale, Georgia
 WHBJ in Barnwell, South Carolina
  in Dayton, Ohio
  in Edmonton, Kentucky
 WIDE-LP in Madison, Wisconsin
 WIEH-LP in Marietta, Georgia
  in Iron River, Michigan
 WIUX-LP in Bloomington, Indiana
  in Keene, Kentucky
  in Jonesville, Virginia
 WKCG-LP in Dothan, Alabama
  in Rice Lake, Wisconsin
  in Pascagoula, Mississippi
 WLXQ in Greensboro, Alabama
  in Milwaukee, Wisconsin
 WNAP-LP in Muncie, Indiana
 WNML-FM in Friendsville, Tennessee
  in Henniker, New Hampshire
  in Plymouth, Massachusetts
  in New Haven, Connecticut
 WPRM-FM in San Juan, Puerto Rico
 WQEE-LP in Newnan, Georgia
  in Jacksonville, Florida
 WQRT-LP in Indianapolis, Indiana
  in Ebensburg, Pennsylvania
 WRWS-LP in Daytona Beach, Florida
 WSLQ in Roanoke, Virginia
  in Buchanan, Michigan
 WUJM-LP in St. Petersburg, Florida
 WVIC-LP in Saint Paul, Minnesota
  in Manteo, North Carolina
 WVVD-LP in Seffner, Florida
 WWKN in Morgantown, Kentucky
  in Avon Park, Florida
 WWSX-LP in Rehoboth Beach, Delaware
 WXDR-LP in New Orleans, Louisiana
  in Gloucester, Virginia
 WXNW-LP in Seven Oaks, South Carolina
 WYKC in Whitefield, New Hampshire
  in Greenwood, Mississippi
  in Savoy, Illinois
  in Whiteville, North Carolina
 WZQC-LP in Cicero, Illinois

References

Lists of radio stations by frequency